The Snow Dome is an indoor ski slope at Bispingen in the German state of Lower Saxony. It opened on 21 October 2006.

The incline varies between 20% at the top and 9% at the bottom.

There are two ski lifts in the hall: a button lift with a capacity of 1,600 passengers/hour and a chair lift with a capacity of 3,000 passengers/hour. There is also a Magic carpet (ski lift) for the nursery slope.

The interior temperature of the hall, which is open all year round, is kept at a constant .

The Snow Dome was closed on 31 March 2013 and employees were given their notice. It reopened in November 2013 after much redevelopment work.

References

External links 
Snow Dome, Bispingen

Indoor ski resorts
Lüneburg Heath